Bror van der Zijde (born 13 February 1989) is a Dutch bobsledder.

Van der Zijde competed at the 2014 Winter Olympics for the Netherlands. He teamed with driver Edwin van Calker in the two-man event, finishing 19th, and with van Calker, Sybren Jansma and Arno Klaassen in the four-man event, finishing 11th.

Van der Zijde made his World Cup debut in November 2012. As of April 2014, his best World Cup finish is 7th, in a four-man event in 2013-14 at Konigssee.

He joined the Swiss national bobsleigh team as a brakeman for Rico Peter ahead of the 2014-15 season.

References

1989 births
Living people
Dutch male bobsledders
Olympic bobsledders of the Netherlands
Sportspeople from Gouda, South Holland
Bobsledders at the 2014 Winter Olympics